St. Anthony’s Higher Secondary School, is an educational institution of the Catholic Church, belonging to and managed by the Salesians of Don Bosco Educational Society (registered as ‘St. Anthony’s Educational and Charitable Society’ under the Meghalaya Societies Registration Act 12 of 1983. no e. 16 (RS) 30/2001/374).Guided by the religious and educational philosophy of St. John Bosco, the school was founded to bring school education within the reach of the common man.

History
The present St. Anthony’s Higher Secondary school began as an orphanage in 1901 by the Salvatorian Fathers. Fr. Winkler SDS was the first director of the Orphanage. It was converted into a school in 1915 by the Jesuits. Fr. JU Lambergh SJ was the first Jesuit Director of the Orphanage and School. In the same year Bro Leo Brisson CSC became the Director.

In 1922 when the Salesians first came to North East India, the orphanage and the school were handed over to them. Fr. Bonardi SDB was the first Salesian to take over charge as headmaster. In 1928, Fr. Bacchiarello, was appointed Headmaster. Fr. J. Bacchiarello separated the Orphanage from the School. A separate school called Don Bosco Industrial School was also opened and it was placed under the then parish priest Fr. Vendrame SDB.

The school received its recognition from the authorities on 19 August 1932. The school had students of theology as teachers till 1933. By 1933 all the students of theology were exempted from this extra activity.

Fr. Joseph Bacchierello SDB started St. Anthony’s College in the year 1934. It began with the arts section and then a teacher’s training school. Fr. Bacchierello was succeeded by Fr. Ricaldone in 1935. Fr. Ricaldone put up the ground floor of the School building, which during the Second World War, was occupied by the Military. During those years, the school and the college functioned on shift basis.
  
In 1940 Fr. Noel Joseph Kenny SDB joined the college as an English Professor. He was later appointed as warden of the hostel and the vice principal of the college. In 1943 and in 1959 Fr. Kenny was given additional charge of looking after the school.

After World War II, the school was shifted to the present junior school section in Don Bosco Complex and the college fully occupied the new building. Thus St. Anthony's High School got its independent existence from the college 1946 with Fr. Kenny as its Headmaster.

In 1961 Fr. Kenny handed over charge to Fr. John Odey. After the three years of 1963 to 1966 Fr. Tarcicius Resto Phanrang handed over the school to Fr. Abraham Alangimattathil. On his appointment as the Bishop of Kohima-Imphal  Fr. Henry Lionel took over as Headmaster. In 1971, Fr. KV George became Headmaster. During his time the school made rapid progress in sports and games and won the Subrato Cup. In 1981 Fr. Stephen Mavely took over as Headmaster of the School and began the construction of the Don Bosco mini Stadium. 
 
In 1986 Rev. Fr. Louis Arimpoor was appointed the Headmaster in place of Fr. Stephen Mavely who moved down to St. Anthony’s College as Principal. Fr. Sebastian Palatty was appointed Headmaster on 10 April 1990. From 1992 the St. Anthony’s Junior School was given a separate identity in the present Anton Hall. In the meantime the construction of the New St. Anthony's Higher Secondary School was begun by the province in the Old College site.

In February 1995 the St. Anthony’s junior school was amalgamated into the High school. In 1996 the school opted for Plus II Science Stream under the Meghalaya Board of School Education. In February 1997, the entire school was shifted to the new building of St. Anthony’s Higher Secondary School, after it was blessed on 17 March 1997, by Archbishop Tarcisius Phanrang Resto SDB and Bishop Abraham Alangimattil SDB, both former headmasters. The new school building was inaugurated by Shri MM Jacob, the then Governor of Meghalaya on 20 March 1997 in the presence of Fr. Dominic Jala the then provincial. Thus, St. Anthony’s Higher Secondary School became an activity of the Salesian Community of Salesian Training Centre. Fr. Sebastian Palatty SDB handed over the keys to Fr. Joseph Anikuzhikattil SDB as the principal, Secretary and vice rector of the unified Higher Secondary School and Salesian Training Centre on 7 April 1977.

In August 1998 Fr. LB Anthony went to London, England, for a year of study and Fr. T.O. Jose was appointed the Rector. Fr. John Paramkamalil SDB took over charge of the school on 8 October 1998 and when Fr. TO Jose went for further studies, Fr. Joseph Almeida SDB took charge as Rector on 30 June 1999.

As St. Anthony’s Higher Secondary school opened Commerce Stream on 1 March 2000, the Junior School, consisting of Nursery to class three was shifted to Don Bosco Technical School with Fr. Marius Thongnibah as Headmaster. With the opening of commerce stream St. Anthony’s Higher Secondary Section became co-education at the Higher Secondary level.

On 17 January 2001, Fr. Thomas Kunnappallil was appointed Rector. On completion of his term on 05.05.2004 Fr. Joseph Parippil was appointed Rector. When father parippil went for treatment on 08.05.2006, Fr. Thomas Edamattathu took charge as the Rector and Bro. Albert Longley Dkhar was appointed as Principal from December 2006. He is the first Salesian Brother to take up an assignment as principal of St Anthony’s Higher Secondary School. On 6 June 2009 Fr. Joseph Anikuzhikattil SDB took charge as Rector at Salesian Training Centre. In May 2010, the school began also the Arts stream at plus two levels. In June 2010 Fr. Rajendran Kuttinadar George was appointed the Principal. Presently Fr. Bernard Grace and Fr. Surjit Tigga is appointed as principal and Vice Principal. The school also has smart class available from 2011 for class 6 to 12. The sports academy and computer academy was inaugurated in August 2011.

Headmaster & Principal
1911 :	Rev. Fr. Heribert Winkler SDS
1915 : Rev. Fr. J.U. Lambergh SJ
1915 :	Rev. Br. Leo Brisson CSC
1922 :	Rev. Fr. Joseph Bonardi SDB
1928 :	Rev. Fr. Joseph Bacchiarello SDB
1934 :	Rev. Fr. IginoRicaldone SDB
1941 :	Rev. Fr. Remo Silva SDB
1942 :	Rev. Fr. Cremin SDB
1943 :	Rev. Fr. Noel Joseph Kenny SDB
1949 :	Rev. Fr. Albert Negri SDB
1951 :	Rev. Fr. Orestes Pavioti SDB
1952 :	Rev. Fr. Joseph ArokiaSwamy SDB
1959 :	Rev. Fr. Noel Joseph Kenny SDB
1961 :	Rev. Fr. TarcisiusRestoPhanrang SDB
1966 :	Rev. Fr. John O’Day SDB
1966 :	Rev. Fr. Abraham Alangimattathil SDB
1967 :	Rev. Fr. Henry Lionel SDB
1971 :	Rev. Fr. George Karippaparampil SDB
1981 :	Rev. Fr. Stephen Mavely SDB
1986 :	Rev. Fr. Louis Arimboor SDB
1990 :	Rev. Fr. Sebastian Palatty SDB
1997 :	Rev. Fr. Jose Anikuzhikattil SDB
1998 :	Rev. Fr. John Parankimalil SDB
2007 :	Rev. Br. Albert Longley Dkhar SDB
2010 :	Rev. Fr. RajendranKuttinadar SDB
2012 : Rev. Fr. Bernard Grace Pala SDB
2016 : Rev.Fr.Surgit Tigga SDB
2019: Rev.Fr. Anthony Kharkongor

References
School website

Salesian secondary schools
Catholic secondary schools in India
High schools and secondary schools in Meghalaya
Education in Shillong
Educational institutions established in 1901
1901 establishments in India